Isalomyia is a genus of wormlion in the family Vermileonidae.

Species
Isalomyia irwini Stuckenberg, 2022

References

Diptera of Africa
Brachycera genera
Taxa named by Brian Roy Stuckenberg
Vermileonomorpha